Treacle tart is a traditional British dessert. The earliest known recipe for the dessert is from English author Mary Jewry in her cookbooks from the late 19th century.

Desserts

It is prepared using shortcrust pastry, with a thick filling made of golden syrup (also known as light treacle), breadcrumbs, and lemon juice or zest. The tart is normally served hot or warm with a scoop of clotted cream, ordinary cream, ice cream, or custard. Some modern recipes add cream, eggs, or both in order to create a softer filling.

Treacle bread is a homemade bread popular in Ireland and is similar to soda bread but with the addition of treacle.

In popular culture
 "Treacle tart" is Cockney rhyming slang for "sweetheart".
 This dessert featured in the 1968 British fantasy film Chitty Chitty Bang Bang. The villainous Child Catcher, in an attempt to lure out the children from the basement, calls out that he is giving away free sweets.
 In the Harry Potter book series, Harry's favourite food is treacle tart, a dessert often found at the Hogwarts feasts.
 In the Agatha Christie murder mystery "4:50 from Paddington" a homeowner's son, home visiting from boarding school with a friend, is said to be particularly fond of treacle tart. "Audiobooks" 1:37:58 as read by Rosemary Leach. Retrieved 13 February 2023.
 It narrowly defeated the Pecan Pie in the Pie-Off during episode 108 of the Dave Dameshek Football Program.
In Season 3 Episode 1 of Downton Abbey, the dessert is featured at the servant's lunchtime, where Carson exclaims, "That treacle tart hit the spot, thank you Mrs. Patmore".

See also
 Butter tart
 List of pies, tarts and flans
 Sugar pie

References

Further reading
 Treacle tart recipe by Heston Blumenthal from Times Online (Paid subscription required)
 Treacle tart recipe by Nigel Slater from The Guardian

British pies
British desserts
English cuisine
Sweet pies
Tarts
Victorian cuisine
Food and drink introduced in the 19th century